Ceylan Arısan (born January 1, 1994 in Izmir, Turkey) is a Turkish female volleyball player. She was with Karşıyaka İzmir before she transferred in 2008 to Eczacıbaşı VitrA. Arısan is a member of the Turkey women's national volleyball team, and wears number 6.

Clubs
  Karşıyaka İzmir (2007-2008)
  Eczacıbaşı VitrA (2008-2015)

Awards

National team
 2011 CEV Girls Youth European Championship - 
 2011 FIVB Girls Youth World Championship - 
 2011 European Youth Summer Olympic Festival - 
 2012 Women's Junior European Volleyball Championship - 
 2014 Women's European Volleyball League - 
 2015 FIVB Volleyball Women's U23 World Championship -

See also
 Turkish women in sports

References

External links
 

1994 births
Sportspeople from İzmir
Living people
Turkish women's volleyball players
Eczacıbaşı volleyball players
Turkey women's international volleyball players